South is a cardinal direction or compass point.

South or The South may also refer to:

Geography
 Global South, the developing nations of the world
 South (lunar crater)
 South (Martian crater)
 Southern England ("The South")
 Southern United States ("The South")
 Confederate States of America ("The South") during the American Civil War
 South India

Films, books, music and other media

Books and written media
 The South (novel), by Colm Tóibín
 "The South" (short story), by Jorge Luis Borges
 South magazine, a bi-monthly magazine published in Savannah, Georgia
 south, interdisciplinary journal formerly known as Southern Literary Journal
 South (book) by Ernest Shackleton

Film and television titles
 The South (film), or El Sur, by Victor Erice
 South (television play) (1959), by Gerald Savory (UK), known as the "earliest known gay TV drama"
 South, a 1988 two-episode spin-off from British soap opera Brookside, starring Justine Kerrigan  and Sean McKee

Music groups
 South (band), a rock band from London, England, active 1998-2009
 The South, a band formed in 2008 by former members of The Beautiful South
 South, duo composed of songwriter Fred Burch and pianist Don Hill, 1969
 South, project of Lonnie Mack and Ed Labunski, 1978

Recordings and releases
 South (Heather Nova album), 2001
 South (Shona Laing album), 1987/1988
 South (EP), an album by Ego Likeness
 South (composition), a jazz composition written by and made popular by Bennie Moten's Kansas City Orchestra
 "South", a song by Karate from the album Some Boots
 "The South" (song), a 2013 single by The Cadillac Three
 South (EP), an album by Hippo Campus

Other uses
 South (surname), list of people with the surname South
 South River (disambiguation)
 South (European Parliament constituency), in Republic of Ireland
 South (Cardiff electoral ward), a former ward in Wales
 South, Luton, a ward in Luton, Bedfordshire, England
 South Melbourne FC, a soccer club
 South of Scotland rugby union team
 The South (Freemasonry), the social phase of a meeting

See also
 Southern (disambiguation)
 Souths (disambiguation)